Illustrators for Gender Equality (Dibujantes por la Igualdad de Género) is an international art exhibition conceived in 2007 with the aim of encouraging gender equality through opinion cartoons.

The exhibition comprises artworks of 30 graphic artists from 20 countries, and the cartoons do not include any words in order to reach out to all audiences, regardless of language.

Till present, Illustrators for Gender Equality has been shown in Spain, Mexico, Sweden, Cuba and Singapore; supported by organizations for the rights of women, cultural associations, governmental organizations and universities.

Tour

2007

 Galileo Showroom, Madrid (Spain).
 Latinarte Showroom, Madrid (Spain).
 La Paloma Cultural Center, Madrid (Spain).
 Villa de Vallecas Youth Center, Madrid (Spain).

2008

 Royal Mail House, Madrid (Spain).
 Oaxaca City Palace Museum, Oaxaca (Mexico).

2009

 UNAM (Autonomous University of Mexico), Méjico F.D. (Mexico).
 Colima Regional Museum, Colima (Mexico).
 Francisco Velázquez, Havana (Cuba).
 Umeå University, Umeå (Sweden).
 Pintores Gallery, Cáceres (Spain).

2010

 La Musa Gallery, Baracoa (Cuba).

2011

 Palace of Justice of Xalapa, Veracruz (Mexico).

2012

 Palace of Justice of San Cristóbal de las Casas, Chiapas (Mexico).
 Palace of Justice of Yucatán, Yucatán (Mexico).

2013

 The Arts House, Singapore.
 Palace of Duke of Pastrana, Guadalajara (Spain).

Artists
 Blasberg (Argentina)
 Tsocho Peev (Bulgaria)
 Menekse Cam (Turkey)
 Huang Kun, Yu Liang, Ni Rong (China)
 Elena Ospina, Vladdo (Colombia)
 Oki (Costa Rica)
 Falco, Ares, Adán (Cuba)
 Kilia (Dominican Republic)
 Pancho Cajas (Ecuador)
 Kimberly Gloria Choi (Hong Kong)
 Victor Ndula (Kenya)
 Boligan, Dario, Rocko (Mexico)
 Derkaoui (Morocco)
 Tayo Fatunla (Nigeria)
 Firuz Kutal (Norway)
 Florian-Doru Crihana (Romania)
 Omar Zevallos (Peru)
 Doris (Poland)
 Node, JRmora, Sex, Enio (Spain)
 Miel (Singapore)
 Enos (USA)

Bibliography

 El País Newspaper
 https://archive.today/20121220194531/http://www.karikaturculerdernegi.org/detay.asp?id=6135
 https://www.infobuckle.com/2019/12/gender-parity-index-2020-which.html
 http://www.jrmora.com/blog/2009/10/16/dibujantes-por-la-igualdad-de-suecia-a-caceres/
 https://archive.today/20121209070434/http://www.extremadura.com/agenda/exposiciones/inauguracion_de_dibujantes_por_la_igualdad_de_genero.html
 http://www.yucatannoticias.com/2012/06/muestra-itinerante-dibujantes-por-la-igualdad-de-generoen-los-juzgados-del-poder-judicial/

Cartooning
Gender equality
Art exhibitions in Spain